Josh Patrick Gabriel (born 30 November 1999) is a Grenadian professional footballer who plays as a winger for the Alderson Broaddus Battlers , and the Grenada national team.

International career
Gabriel made his debut with the Grenada in 0–0 friendly tie with Barbados on 4 March 2019. He was called up to represent Grenada at the 2021 CONCACAF Gold Cup.

References

External links
 
 

1999 births
Living people
Grenadian footballers
Grenada international footballers
Grenada under-20 international footballers
Alderson Broaddus Battlers men's soccer players
Association football wingers
Grenadian expatriate footballers
Grenadian expatriate sportspeople in the United States
Expatriate soccer players in the United States
2021 CONCACAF Gold Cup players